The Lisboa Belém Open is a professional tennis tournament played on clay courts. It is currently part of the ATP Challenger Tour and the ITF Women's World Tennis Tour. It is held annually in Lisbon, Portugal since 2017.

Past finals

Men's singles

Women's singles

Men's doubles

Women's doubles

External links
 Official website

 
ITF Women's World Tennis Tour
Recurring sporting events established in 2017